Robert Gerard (23 December 1920 – 16 January 2010) was a Belgian footballer. He played in two matches for the Belgium national football team from 1944 to 1945.

References

External links
 

1920 births
2010 deaths
Belgian footballers
Belgium international footballers
Association football defenders
People from Lier, Belgium
Footballers from Antwerp Province